Conset Bay is a bay on the east coast of Barbados. Near the community of St. Marks, it lies off the southeastern shoreline of the Parish of St. John.

References

Bays of Barbados
Saint John, Barbados